Rimóc is a village in Nógrád County,  Northern Hungary Region, Hungary. Its population was 1 757 as of a 2012 census.

References

Populated places in Nógrád County